Prudence Elizabeth French (born 1950), is a female former athlete who competed for England.

Athletics career
French became the 1972 National champion after winning the British AAA javelin championship.

She represented England in the javelin event, at the 1974 British Commonwealth Games in Christchurch, New Zealand.

References

1950 births
English female javelin throwers
Athletes (track and field) at the 1974 British Commonwealth Games
Living people
Commonwealth Games competitors for England